Hermann Leuenberger (15 July 1901 – 30 December 1975) was a Swiss trade union leader and politician.

Born in Basel, Leuenberger started an apprenticeship as a painter, but became active in the Social Democratic Party of Switzerland (SP) and the trade union movement.  He was particularly inspired by the October Revolution, and spent time in 1920 and 1921 in the Soviet Union.  He then returned to Basel, to work as a labourer, while holding membership of the Union of Commerce, Transport and Food (VHTL).

In 1924 and 1925, Leuenberger undertook labour movement training in Frankfurt am Main, then returned once more to Basel, where he worked as a chauffeur.  In 1929, he began working full-time for the VHTL, as a secretary, becoming central secretary in 1933, and then central president in 1941.  From 1939 until 1948, he also served as president and acting general secretary of the International Union of Food and Allied Workers' Associations.

Leuenberger also remained active in the SP, winning election as a councillor in Zurich in 1935.  In 1939, he was elected to the Swiss Federal Assembly, representing the Canton of Zürich, serving until 1971.  From 1954 until 1969, he was also a member of the SP's management committee.  He additionally founded the Foundation for Consumer Protection, and campaigned for consumer rights and equality for women.

In 1937, Leuenberger was elected to the executive of the Swiss Trade Union Federation (SGB), becoming its vice president in 1943, and president in 1958, retiring in 1968.  He argued in favour of all its affiliates merging to become a single union, but this did not find significant support.

References

1901 births
1975 deaths
Members of the Federal Assembly (Switzerland)
Politicians from Basel-Stadt
Social Democratic Party of Switzerland politicians
Swiss trade unionists